Ciprian Sora (born 23 October 1976) is a Romanian kickboxing trainer and founder of the Golden Glory Romania gym in Bucharest. As an athlete, he became the first ever Romanian to win a gold medal at the Muay Thai world championships in 1999 and still holds the record for that. Sora had an amateur record of 75–5, being undefeated in Romania throughout his career before turning professional. He signed with Local Kombat, the future SUPERKOMBAT, in 2004.

Career
Ciprian Sora took up kickboxing and Muay Thai at 14 under the tutelage of Dan Deliu. He began his amateur career in 1996 under the tutelage of shinan Mircea Boldea. Sora came to prominence in 1999 by taking a gold medal at the IAMTF World Championships in Bangkok, Thailand at −86 kg/189 lb, where his cousin Daniel Ghiță also fought and won the bronze medal in another weight category. Having amassed undefeated kickboxing and Muay Thai records in Romania from 1996 to 2003, he turned professional. In 2004 he signed with the largest Romanian kickboxing promotion Local Kombat. 

In 2009, he founded the Golden Glory Romania kickboxing gym in Bucharest, Romania. Also present at the ceremony were Semmy Schilt, Dave Jonkers, Bas Boon, Andre Mannaart, Todd Medina and Eduard Irimia. Later were added Muay Thai and Brazilian jiu-jitsu (BJJ) to the gym's repertoire.

Championships and accomplishments 
Source:

Muaythai
International Federation of Muaythai Amateur
1999 IAMTF World Championships −86 kg/189 lb Gold Medalist 
1997 IAMTF World Championships Bronze Medalist 
1998 IAMTF European Championships Silver Medalist 
2000 IAMTF European Championships Bronze Medalist

Kickboxing
International Kick Boxing Federation
1997 IKBF World Cup Silver Medalist 
1998 IKBF European Championships Gold Medalist 

Local Kombat
 2007 Fighter of the Year
 2007 Most Technical Fighter of the Year

World Kickboxing Network
 2007 WKN Romania Heavyweight Championship

Personal life
He has not got along with his cousin Daniel Ghiță since 2012 when he received Semmy Schilt at his academy to train for the Glory 4: Tokyo grand slam. Ghiță accused Sora of training Schilt for him, the two being in the same heavyweight pyramid and later even meeting in the final. 

Sora holds a 3rd dan black belt in kickboxing.

Kickboxing record

|-
|-  bgcolor="#CCFFCC"
| 2008-03-15 || Win ||align=left| Damián García || Local Kombat 29 || Arad, Romania || Decision || 3 || 3:00 || 15-2
|-
|-  bgcolor="#CCFFCC"
| 2007-12-14 || Win ||align=left| Vadim Gridiajev || Local Kombat 28 || Brașov, Romania || KO || 2 || 1:58 || 14-2
|- 
|-  bgcolor="#FFBBBB"
| 2007-06-15 || Loss ||align=left| Petr Vondráček || Local Kombat 26 || Iași, Romania || KO (high kick) || 1 || 0:15 || 13-2
|- 
|-  bgcolor="#FFBBBB"
| 2007-03-02 || Loss ||align=left| Petr Vondráček || Local Kombat 25 || Sibiu, Romania || KO (punches) || 1 || 2:08 || 13-1
|-
|-  style="background:#c5d2ea;"
| 2006-11-11 || NC ||align=left| Cătălin Zmărăndescu || Local Kombat 23 || Râmnicu Vâlcea, Romania || No contest || 3 || 0:47 || 13-0
|- 
|-  bgcolor="#CCFFCC"
| 2006-04-14 || Win ||align=left| Cătălin Zmărăndescu || Local Kombat 20 || Râmnicu Vâlcea, Romania || Decision (unanimous) || 5 || 3:00 || 13-0
|-
! style=background:white colspan=9 |
|-
|-  bgcolor="#CCFFCC"
| 2005-11-11 || Win ||align=left| Péter Varga || Local Kombat 17 || Braşov, Romania || Decision || 3 || 3:00 || 12-0
|-
|-  bgcolor="#CCFFCC"
| 2005-07-22 || Win ||align=left| Karl Glischynski || Local Kombat 15 || Galați, Romania || Decision || 3 || 3:00 || 11-0
|-
|-  bgcolor="#CCFFCC"
| 2004-09-11 || Win ||align=left| Alexandru Vitenco || Local Kombat 9 || Constanța, Romania || KO || 1 || 0:27 || 10-0
|-
|-  bgcolor="#CCFFCC"
| 2004-05-14 || Win ||align=left| Liviu Iușan || Local Kombat 6 || Galați, Romania || KO (punch) || 2 || 1:45 || 9-0
|-
|-  bgcolor="#CCFFCC"
| 2004-02-04 || Win ||align=left| Nicu Stanciu || Local Kombat 4 || Braşov, Romania || KO || 2 || 2:12 || 8-0
|- 
|-
| colspan=9 | Legend:

See also 
List of male kickboxers

References

External links
 Official website

1976 births
Living people
Sportspeople from Bucharest 
Romanian male kickboxers
Heavyweight kickboxers 
Romanian Muay Thai practitioners
Kickboxing trainers
SUPERKOMBAT kickboxers